"The Attitude Song" is the sixth track of Steve Vai's debut solo album Flex-Able, which was released in 1984. One of Vai's most frequently performed pieces, it appears on the G3: Live in Concert DVD, on the Live at Astoria DVD (with special guest Eric Sardinas), and in orchestral form with the Metropole Orkest on Sound Theories.

On March 4, 2010, as part of the launch of Harmonix's Rock Band Network downloadable content platform, "The Attitude Song" was offered as new content for Rock Band.  Also offered were Vai's "Get The Hell Out Of Here" and a live version of "For The Love Of God".

"The Attitude Song" was the first Guitar Player magazine "Soundsheet", published in the October 1984 issue.

External links
 Steve Vai's homepage
 Steve Vai's Official MySpace
 Myspace: G3
 Steve Vai's page on the Flex-Able album

1984 songs
1980s instrumentals
Rock instrumentals
Songs written by Steve Vai